James Connolly, or Conolly, was an Irish stonemason, from Adare, County Limerick.  He is best known for his work on Adare Manor in the 19th century.

He supervised the construction of the building over a 21-year period.  An inscription on the east front of Adare Manor commemorates 'James Conolly of Adare, mason, faithful friend and servant of the Earl of Dunraven, from AD 1831 till his death in 1852'.

There is also a tribute to James Connolly, by the 3rd Earl of Dunraven, in the book "Memorials of Adare manor."

References

Irish stonemasons
1852 deaths
Artists from County Limerick
19th-century Irish people
Year of birth missing